Goin' for Myself is the third album by session guitarist Dennis Coffey.

Track listing 
All tracks composed by Dennis Coffey; except where indicated
"Taurus" - 3:00
"Can You Feel It" - (Mike Theodore, Dennis Coffey)  2:50
"Never Can Say Goodbye" - (Clifton Davis )  4:18
"Ride, Sally, Ride" - 3:06
"Midnight Blue" - 2:43
"Bridge Over Troubled Water" - (Paul Simon)  5:03
"Man and Boy (Main Theme)" - (Bill Withers, J.J. Johnson)  2:23
"It's Too Late" - (Carole King, Tony Stern)  5:21 
"Toast and Jam" - 6:14

Personnel 
Dennis Coffey - Guitar
Bob Babbitt, Tony Newton - Bass
Andrew Smith - Drums
Eric Morgeson - Keyboards
James Barnes - Congas
Jack Ashford - Tambourine
Alvin Score, Barbara Fickett, Beatriz Staples, Bob Cowart, Carl Raetz, David Ireland, Felix Resnick, Fred Boldt, Haim Shtrum, Jack Boesen, LeRoy Fenstermacher, Mario DiFiore, Parke Groat, Richard Margitza, Virginia Halfman, Wally Gomulka - Horns, Strings
Emanuel Johnson, Joyce Vincent, Pam Vincent, Rothwell Wilson, Telma Hopkins, Tyrone Brown - Backing Vocals

Charts

Singles
The single, "Taurus", reached number eleven on the US Soul Singles chart.

References

External links
 Dennis Coffey-Goin' for Myself at Discogs

1972 albums
Dennis Coffey albums
Sussex Records albums